Survey Graphic (SG) was a United States magazine launched in 1921. From 1921 to 1932, it was published as a supplement to The Survey and became a separate publication in 1933. SG focused on sociological and political research and analysis of national and international issues. Bidding his readers to "embark on a voyage of discovery", editor Paul Kellogg used a metaphor of a ship in his inaugural remarks for the new magazine: "Survey Graphic will reach into the corners of the world — America and all the Seven Seas — to wherever the tides of a generous progress are astir."  Article topics included fascism, anti-Semitism, poverty, unions and the working class, and education and political reform. The magazine ceased publication in 1952.

In March 1925 the magazine produced an issue on "Harlem: Mecca of the New Negro", which was devoted to the African-American literary and artistic movement now known as the Harlem Renaissance and established Harlem's status as the black mecca. Alain Locke guest-edited this issue. Much of the material appears in his 1925 anthology The New Negro.

References

External links

There are a few online sources of reprints and other SG related materials.
 The University of Virginia's Electronic Text Center had the complete "Harlem" issue online until 2008 (currently archived via the Internet Archive).
The archival records of Survey Associates, publisher of Survey, are at the Social Welfare History Archives, University of Minnesota Libraries.
Selected records from Survey Associates and issues of Survey and its predecessor, Charities and Commons, are available online on the University of Minnesota Libraries Umedia portal.

Defunct political magazines published in the United States
Defunct magazines published in the United States
Magazines established in 1921
Magazines disestablished in 1952
Newspaper supplements